Włodowice  is a village in the administrative district of Gmina Nowa Ruda, within Kłodzko County, Lower Silesian Voivodeship, in south-western Poland.

The village has a population of 790.

References

Villages in Kłodzko County